Thomas Horan (1839 – January 1, 1902) was an Irish-American soldier who fought with the Union Army in the American Civil War. Horan received his country's highest award for bravery during combat, the Medal of Honor, for actions taken on July 2, 1863, during the Battle of Gettysburg.

Early years
Horan was born in 1839, the first of seven children to Michael and Mary Horan of Ireland. When Horan was around 8–10 years old, the family moved to America, likely to escape the Great Famine. They settled in Dunkirk, New York where Thomas worked as a laborer alongside his father.

Civil War service
Horan enlisted in the Union army on May 14, 1861, as a private. By November he was promoted to corporal, and again to sergeant in September 1862. In 1863, he was at the Battle of Gettysburg where he captured the flag of the 8th Florida Infantry. For this action, he was awarded the Medal of Honor on April 5, 1898.

Horan also fought in the Battle of the Wilderness where he was wounded on May 7, 1864.

Medal of Honor citation

References

External links
Thomas Horan on Find A Grave

1839 births
1902 deaths
American Civil War recipients of the Medal of Honor
People of New York (state) in the American Civil War
United States Army Medal of Honor recipients